James Bellingham (9 April 1877 – 1 October 1955) was a Scottish professional footballer who played as a centre half in the Football League for Grimsby Town. During his second spell with Southern League club Brentford, he took on the role of the club's secretary while secretary-manager Dick Molyneux was ill.

Personal life 
Bellingham was the cousin of fellow Falkirk footballer Thomas Bellingham. At the time of the 1901 United Kingdom census, Bellingham was a lodger at an address in Willesden along with Queens Park Rangers teammate Sandy Newbigging.

Career statistics

References

1877 births
1955 deaths
Scottish footballers
Brentford F.C. players
English Football League players
Association football central defenders
Falkirk F.C. players
Queens Park Rangers F.C. players
Southern Football League players
Footballers from Falkirk
Grimsby Town F.C. players
Tunbridge Wells F.C. players
Willesden F.C. players
Brentford F.C. non-playing staff